Samuel Arnold (June 1, 1806 – May 5, 1869) was a U.S. Representative from Connecticut.

Born in Haddam, Arnold attended the local academy at Plainfield, and Westfield Academy, Massachusetts. He devoted most of his life to agricultural pursuits. He acquired a controlling interest in a stone quarry, and became owner of a line of schooners operating between New York and Philadelphia. He was, also, for a number of years, president of the Bank of East Haddam. He served as member of the Connecticut House of Representatives in 1839, 1842, 1844, and again in 1851.

Arnold was elected as a Democrat to the Thirty-fifth Congress (March 4, 1857 – March 3, 1859). He declined to be a candidate for renomination in 1858. He resumed agricultural pursuits and quarrying. He died in Haddam on May 5, 1869. He was interred in a mausoleum on his estate near Haddam.

References

External links
Samuel Arnold (1806–1869) entry at the Political Graveyard
 and also cenotaph here

1806 births
1869 deaths
Democratic Party members of the Connecticut House of Representatives
People from Haddam, Connecticut
Democratic Party members of the United States House of Representatives from Connecticut
19th-century American politicians